The 2022–23 UC San Diego Tritons men's basketball team represented the University of California, San Diego in the 2022–23 NCAA Division I men's basketball season. The Tritons, led by tenth-year head coach Eric Olen, played their home games at the LionTree Arena in La Jolla, California, as members of the Big West Conference.

The Tritons are ineligible for postseason tournaments, including the NCAA tournament, as they are in the third year of the a four-year mandatory transition period to Division I.

Previous season
The Tritons finished the 2021–22 season 13–16, 7–11 in Big West play, which would have put them in eighth place, but their conference games did not count on the records of the Tritons or any other member of the Big West, due to their four-year mandatory transition period to Division I.

Roster

Schedule and results

|-
!colspan=12 style=| Non-conference regular season

|-
!colspan=12 style=| Big West regular season

Sources

References

UC San Diego Tritons men's basketball seasons
UC San Diego Tritons
UC San Diego Tritons men's basketball
UC San Diego Tritons men's basketball